Denise Burse-Mickelbury (born January 13, 1952) is an American actress, best known for her role as Claretha Jenkins in the television series Tyler Perry's House of Payne.

Acting career
An African-American native of Atlanta, Burse received professional training at the Just Us Theatre, The Alliance Theatre and The Atlanta Children's Theater. She has numerous television credits such as Law & Order: Special Victims Unit and Law & Order: Criminal Intent. Burse has also appeared in various stage productions such as An American Daughter, Harriet’s Return, Ground People, Pearl Cleage's Flyin' West, and Radio Golf. In 2016, she appeared in "San Junipero", an episode of the anthology series Black Mirror.

Filmography

See also

References

External links
 
 

1952 births
Living people
Actresses from Georgia (U.S. state)
African-American actresses
American television actresses
21st-century African-American people
21st-century African-American women
20th-century African-American people
20th-century African-American women